The Washington Hose and Steam Fire Engine Company, No. 1 is located in Conshohocken, Pennsylvania. The building was built in 1877 and was added to the National Register of Historic Places on November 20, 1975.

See also
National Register of Historic Places listings in Montgomery County, Pennsylvania

References

Fire stations on the National Register of Historic Places in Pennsylvania
Italianate architecture in Pennsylvania
Fire stations completed in 1877
Buildings and structures in Montgomery County, Pennsylvania
Defunct fire stations in Pennsylvania
National Register of Historic Places in Montgomery County, Pennsylvania
1877 establishments in Pennsylvania